M.G.S. Anagennisi Kolindrou is a Greek football club, based on Kolindros, Pieria. It was founded in 1948.

The club spent two consecutive seasons in the Beta Ethniki, in 1995 and 1996. Currently it plays in the Third Division of the local Pieria championships.

References

Football clubs in Central Macedonia
Association football clubs established in 1948
1948 establishments in Greece